Mustallika Nature Reserve is a nature reserve which is located in Jõgeva County, Estonia.

The area of the nature reserve is 50 ha.

The protected area was founded in 1992 to protect Mustallika Bog.

References

Nature reserves in Estonia
Geography of Jõgeva County